Inca Huasi was a paleolake in the Andes. It was named by a research team in 2006.

It existed about 46,000 years ago in the Salar de Uyuni basin. Most water was contributed to it by the Uyuni-Coipasa drainage basin, with only minimal contributions from Lake Titicaca. Changes in the South American monsoon may have triggered its formation.

Radiocarbon dates on tufa which formed in Lake Inca Huasi were dated at 45,760 ± 440 years ago. Uranium-thorium dating has yielded ages between 45,760 and 47,160 years. Overall the lake existed between 46,000 and 47,000 years ago. The Inca Huasi cycle coincides with the marine isotope stage 3, the formation of a deep lake in the Laguna Pozuelos basin and the expansion of glaciers in several parts of South America including the Puna. 

This lake cycle took part during a glacial epoch, along with the Sajsi lake cycles. A more humid climate in northeastern Argentina and elsewhere in subtropical South America has been linked to the Inca Huasi phase. However, rainfall might not have increased by much on the Altiplano during the Inca Huasi cycle.

Other paleolakes are Coipasa, Ouki, Minchin, Sajsi, Salinas and Tauca. Research made in 2006 attributed the "Lake Minchin" to this lake phase.

References

Sources 

 
 
 

Former lakes of South America
Geology of Bolivia
Pleistocene
Lakes of Bolivia